Sergei Semyonovich Scherbakov (20 July 1918 – 27 January 1994) was a Russian welterweight boxer. He won silver medals at the 1952 Olympics and 1953 European Championships, both times losing the final to Zygmunt Chychła. In 1944–53 Scherbakov won 10 consecutive Soviet titles. He retired with a record of 207 wins out of 227 bouts.

Shcherbakov took up boxing in 1936 following he elder brother Aleksandr, and placed within the podium at the Soviet championships in 1939 and 1940. During World War II he fought in a special unit, which was assembled from former athletes to carry out deep raids behind the enemy lines. He was wounded twice and awarded the medals For Courage and For Battle Merit. After retiring from competitions he worked as a boxing coach and referee and trained national teams of the Soviet Union (1954–60) and Egypt (1963–71). His younger brother Vyacheslav was also a promising boxer. He lost an arm in the war, but later became a renowned boxing coach.

References

1918 births
1994 deaths
Soviet male boxers
Olympic boxers of the Soviet Union
Olympic silver medalists for the Soviet Union
Boxers at the 1952 Summer Olympics
Olympic medalists in boxing
Russian male boxers
Medalists at the 1952 Summer Olympics
Welterweight boxers